The following television stations operate on virtual channel 60 in the United States:

 KFXV in Harlingen, Texas
 KPJK in San Mateo, California
 KVDA in San Antonio, Texas
 W41DO-D in New York, New York
 WBPH-TV in Bethlehem, Pennsylvania
 WKHU-CD in Kittanning, Pennsylvania
 WNEU in Merrimack, New Hampshire
 WTJP-TV in Gadsden, Alabama
 WWPX-TV in Martinsburg, West Virginia
 WXFT-DT in Aurora, Illinois

References

60 virtual